Novoye is a rural locality (a selo) and the administrative center of Novinsky Selsoviet of Belogorsky District, Amur Oblast, Russia. The population was 398 as of 2018. There are 12 streets.

Geography 
Novoye is located on the left bank of the Tom River, 40 km east of Belogorsk (the district's administrative centre) by road. Krugloye is the nearest rural locality.

References 

Rural localities in Belogorsky District